Mariouta is a genus of beetles in the family Dermestidae, containing 

 Mariouta letourneuxi Pic, 1898
 Mariouta stangei Reitter, 1910

References

Dermestidae genera